The Latinos Money Magazine, formerly known as Latino Money Magazine, is a quarterly US magazine which is noted for publishing its list of Hispanic billionaires and Hispanic millionaires. It was founded in 2002 by Jomo Thomas for Niche Lab Capital Group.

References

External links
 [Official website]

Business magazines published in the United States
Quarterly magazines published in the United States
Magazines established in 2002